Sos Janibekyan  (born on April 8, 1988), is an Armenian actor, writer and producer. He is known for his role as Gokor on Trapped. He was a guest of White corner on September 25, 2014.

Filmography

External links 

Sos Janibekyan at Facebook
Sos Janibekyan at Instagram
Sos Janibekyan at Rotten Tomatoes
Sos Janibekyan at Kinopoisk

References

1988 births
Living people
Male actors from Yerevan
Armenian male film actors
Armenian male television actors
21st-century Armenian male actors